Christopher Lee Marcus (December 11, 1979 – April 23, 2020) was an American basketball player, best known for his collegiate career at Western Kentucky University between 1999–2000 and 2002–03.

Early life
Marcus was born in Chicago, Illinois but raised in Charlotte, North Carolina. By the time he was soundly into his high school career, Marcus was a certified seven-footer. However, he did not begin playing basketball until the school's new head coach, David Davis, convinced him to play for the team.

After former Clemson coach Dennis Felton became head coach at Western Kentucky, he recruited Marcus to play for him.

Career
As a true freshman in 1998–99 at Western Kentucky University, Marcus did not play basketball in order to focus on his grades. When Marcus started playing for the team, he averaged 11.5 points and 9.5 rebounds per game en route to being named the Sun Belt Newcomer of the Year and Defender of the Year.

The following season, Marcus's sophomore season, he led the Hilltoppers in scoring at 16.7 points per game, and his 12.1 rebounds per game led all of NCAA Division I. Western Kentucky compiled a 24–7 record, winning the Sun Belt regular season and conference tournament championships, on their way to an NCAA Tournament berth.

During Marcus's last two years at WKU, a pre-season injury to his ankle sidelined him for months during his junior year. After rushing his rehabilitation, Marcus only lasted half of his senior season before he returned to Charlotte. During his final two years of college, Marcus developed an addiction to alcohol.

Marcus participated in the Denver Nuggets training camp, but never played a game in the NBA.

Awards and honors
Sun Belt Newcomer of the Year (1999–00)
Sun Belt Defensive Player of the Year (1999–00)
Sun Belt Tournament MVP (2000–01)
NCAA Division I rebounding leader (2000–01)
Sun Belt Conference Men's Basketball Player of the Year (2000–01)
2× Associated Press Honorable Mention All-American (2000–01, 2001–02)
Lindy's College Basketball All-America Team (2001)

Personal life 
Marcus joined Alcoholics Anonymous (AA) in 2005 and overcame his addiction to alcohol. He remained active in AA for the rest of his life and had a career as a counselor for children with disabilities or behavioral issues, declining offers to return to basketball as a coach.

Marcus died on April 23, 2020, in Charlotte, North Carolina from a pulmonary embolism.

References

1979 births
2020 deaths
American men's basketball players
Basketball players from Charlotte, North Carolina
Basketball players from Chicago
Centers (basketball)
Western Kentucky Hilltoppers basketball players